Anna Pennington (December 23, 1893 – November 4, 1971) was an American actress, dancer, and singer who starred on Broadway in the 1910s and 1920s, notably in the Ziegfeld Follies and George White's Scandals.

She became famous for what was, at the time, called a "Shake and Quiver Dancer", and was noted for her variation of the "Black Bottom". She also was noted as an accomplished tap dancer. Ray Henderson wrote the extant version of "Black Bottom" for Ann – she had already been performing the popular version of the dance for some time. Some years prior to this, she had also topped the bill on Broadway in her performance of the musically similar "Charleston".

Pennington also achieved fame as a star of both silent and sound motion pictures.

Early life 
 
Pennington was born in Wilmington, Delaware, on December 23, 1893, and reputedly moved with her family to Camden, New Jersey, around 1900. Her father worked for the Victor music company, they were Quakers, and she had at least one sibling, Nellie.

She learned to dance with the Professor Wroe dance school, and her first performances in New York were as part of "Wroe's Buds".   She also studied with Caroline Littlefield, mother of ballerina/choreographer Catherine Littlefield, in Philadelphia.    She wanted to be a classical actress, but her diminutive stature and talent as a dancer conspired against this ambition.

Career 
She began her career on Broadway as a member of the chorus in The Red Widow (1911) starring Raymond Hitchcock. Her debut in the Ziegfeld Follies was in 1913, where she quickly established herself as one Ziegfeld's top attractions.

With dimpled knees and long dark red hair, the petite, pretty, charming, and often scantly-clad Pennington stood a mere 4' 10" tall and wore only a size 1½ shoe. Because of her diminutive stature, she was referred to as "Penny" by her friends and colleagues. Her nickname for herself was "Tiny".

During her years in the Ziegfeld Follies she appeared alongside the likes of Bert Williams, Eddie Cantor, Will Rogers, Fanny Brice (who became her closest friend), Marilyn Miller, and W.C. Fields. She switched back and forth between George White's Scandals and the Follies more than once, earning a salary of $1,000 per week well before the 1920s, and continued to moonlight in the early New York film industry. She also frequented Harlem in its jazz heyday.

In the 1926 edition of George White's Scandals, Pennington introduced the African American-influenced Black Bottom dance to America at large with her partner, the eccentric dancer Tom Patricola. First popularized in New York by the African American show Dinaah that had been staged in Harlem in 1924, after Pennington performed the Black Bottom on Broadway, the dance became was a national phenomenon, overtaking The Charleston in popularity.

George Gershwin was her rehearsal pianist and wrote several songs for her.  Cole Porter, Ray Henderson, Joe Burke, Oscar Levant and Edward Ward all wrote for her shows, and The New Yorkers (1931) was her last great show for Porter. She could sing as well as dance as evinced by her recording of "Believe Me" (1930).

No films of her signature dance routines have been preserved, with the possible exception of the "Snake-Hips" number which occurs in Happy Days (1929). Her key dances in Gold Diggers on Broadway (1929) remain lost. Some of her scenes from Tanned Legs still survive, but her role in The Great Ziegfeld, while listed in some inventories, was in fact cut before release. She was listed as a star in the 1929 Warner Brothers showcase movie "Show of Shows", but her routines were never filmed, perhaps because her main song and dance number "Believe Me" was commandeered by one of Warners' rising stars Irene Bordoni. Ann did however get to perform "Believe Me" in the 1930 movie "Hello Baby!", which is still in print, and sang and danced "You're responsible" in "Tanned Legs" (for which movie she features in uncredited cartoon form on the posters and sheet music).

She was until the late 1920s chaperoned at performances by her mother. She was noted for a quick and witty personality, but was said to be shy off stage and easily embarrassed, and in her latter years was loath to discuss her early life.

Ann Pennington never settled in one place for very long. She lived mostly in hotels in New York apart from some years in California as the constant companion of Fanny Brice, whom she had helped out at least once with loans and gifts of jewelry. Ann was noted for her generosity and many of her loans were never repaid; however most of her huge earnings were wiped out over the years by betting at the racetrack, decades of hotel bills, and gifts to charities and churches.

After her years on stage and screen ended, Pennington toured in vaudeville. She retired from performing in the 1940s. She last appeared on stage in a benefit show for the armed forces in 1946. She had a committed work ethic, and worked wherever the opportunity arose, although as she aged and tastes changed, she ended her stage days in shabby theaters with low ranked dance companies. Home movie footage of her "Snake Hips" dance at the 1939 World's Fair survive, but is more memorable for her enthusiasm than her star quality in her fading years.

Personal life 
Pennington was romantically linked to several men during her lifetime, and at one time or another allegedly was engaged to boxer Jack Dempsey, theatrical producer and early dance partner George White, actor Buster West, and musician Brooke Johns. None of these romances lasted and Pennington never married. She never spoke on record about any of her engagements, whether to confirm or deny them.

Death 
Ann Pennington died of a stroke in New York City on November 4, 1971, aged 77. After years of performing and living an exciting and colorful life, she lived alone for many years in New York hotels overlooking 42nd Street. She was buried in Kensico Cemetery, Westchester County, New York. No family were known to have attended her funeral, which was paid for by the Actors Benevolent guild.  In noting her death, The New York Times (November 6, 1971) noted 

A few years before her death, she was asked what had been the greatest reward from her years of stardom, and her reply was "in living, honey".

Review
Of Ann Pennington's official film debut in Susie Snowflake, The New York Times stated on June 26, 1916:

She was portrayed by actress Michelle Nicastro in the "Scandals of 1920" episode of The Young Indiana Jones Chronicles, which dramatizes her role as the star of George White's Scandals of 1920.

Stage credits
<div style="font-size: 90%">

The following list includes Ann Pennington's major stage credits:

</div style="font-size: 90%">

Motion picture credits
The following list contains all of Ann Pennington's known motion picture appearances. 
<div style="font-size: 90%">

</div style="font-size: 90%">

References

External links

Silent Ladies and Gents features pictures of Ann Pennington
Ann Pennington portrait at NY Public Library Billy Rose Collection
www.catherinelittlefield.com

1893 births
1971 deaths
American film actresses
American musical theatre actresses
American silent film actresses
American tap dancers
Actors from Camden, New Jersey
Singers from New York City
Ziegfeld girls
20th-century American actresses
Burials at Kensico Cemetery
20th-century American singers
Musicians from Camden, New Jersey
20th-century American women singers
20th-century American dancers